Milwaukee Public Schools (MPS) is the largest school district in Wisconsin. As of the 2015–16 school year, MPS served 75,568 students in 154 schools and had 9,636 full-time equivalent (FTE) staff positions. The Milwaukee Public Schools system is the one of the largest in the United States by enrollment. A publicly elected school board, the Milwaukee Board of School Directors, provides direction and oversight, with a superintendent heading the organization's administration.

The district includes all portions of Milwaukee in Milwaukee County, which means it includes almost all of Milwaukee.

Milwaukee Public Schools' offerings include neighborhood schools, specialty schools and charter schools serving students as young as age 3 up through grade 12.

Programs
Specialty programs in MPS include arts schools such as Milwaukee High School of the Arts; career and technical education schools such as Lynde & Harry Bradley Technology and Trade School; gifted and talented schools such as Golda Meir School; International Baccalaureate and college prep high schools such as Rufus King International School - High School Campus, Riverside University High School and Ronald Reagan College Preparatory High School; language immersion schools including French, German, Italian, and Spanish immersion elementary schools and Milwaukee School of Languages for middle- and high-school students; and a large number of Montessori schools.
 
The district owns WYMS-FM (88.9), which airs an eclectic selection of music and is programmed by a local non-profit group via an LMA.

Performance
While overall reading and math proficiency rates are below the state average and below those of some other large city districts, the district did see some growth in scores in both subjects and both grades tested on the 2013 National Assessment of Educational Progress and on the 2012–13 state standardized tests, MPS students, on the whole, outperformed Milwaukee students receiving publicly funded vouchers to attend private schools.

School District officials note declining funding as a catalyst to problems in the district.  However, local journalists have cited school officials as lacking in motivation to improve the system.
 
The Wisconsin Department of Public Instruction in its 2011−12 School District Performance Report lists Milwaukee's Regular Diploma Graduation Rate at 66.2%.

In 2012, Rufus King International School – High School Campus was ranked the 130th best public high school in the nation, making it the top performing school in the state of Wisconsin. Ronald Reagan College Preparatory High School was ranked second in Wisconsin, while Milwaukee School of Languages was ranked seventh.

Charter schools
In 1990, Milwaukee became the first community in the United States to adopt a school voucher program. The program enables students to receive public funding to study at parochial and other private schools free of cost. The 2006−07 school year marked the first time that more than $100 million was paid in vouchers, as 26% of Milwaukee students receive public funding to attend schools outside the MPS system. If the voucher program alone were considered a school district, it would mark the sixth-largest district in Wisconsin.
 
Under Wisconsin state law, the Milwaukee school board is one of several entities that can authorize charter schools in the city. Other authorities that can authorize charter schools are the Milwaukee City Council, the University of Wisconsin–Milwaukee, and the Milwaukee Area Technical College Board. The first charter school in Milwaukee was the Highland Community School, a Montessori elementary school authorized by Milwaukee Public Schools in 1996.

Schools
An asterisk (*) indicates a charter school.

K4-K schools

 Next Door Foundation School *

K–8 schools

 Auer Ave. Elementary School
 Bay View Montessori School
 Luther Burbank Elementary School
 A.E. Burdick School
 Mary McLeod Bethune Academy
 Dr. Benjamin Carson Academy of Science
 George Washington Carver Academy of Mathematics and Science
 Cass St. School
 James Fenimore Cooper Elementary School
 Craig Montessori School
 Eighty-First St. Elementary School
 Fairview Public School
 Fernwood Montessori School
 Frederick J. Gaenslen School
 Hamlin Garland School
 U.S. Grant Elementary School
 Grantosa Dr. Elementary School
 Greenfield Bilingual School
 Hartford Ave. University School 
 Oliver Wendell Holmes Elementary School
 Hopkins Lloyd Community School
 Humboldt Park School
 I.D.E.A.L. (Individualized Developmental Educational Approaches to Learning) School *
 Keefe Ave. Elementary School
 Martin Luther King Jr. School
 La Causa Charter School *
 Robert M. La Follette Elementary School
 Henry Wadsworth Longfellow Elementary School
 Manitoba Elementary School
 Maryland Ave. Montessori School
 Golda Meir School
 Ralph H. Metcalfe School
 Milwaukee Academy of Chinese Language
 Milwaukee College Prep–36th St. Campus *
 Milwaukee College Prep–38th St. Campus *
 Milwaukee College Prep–Lloyd St. Campus *
 Milwaukee College Prep Lola Rowe–North Campus *
 Milwaukee Environmental Sciences Academy *
 Milwaukee Parkside School for the Arts
 Milwaukee Sign Language School
 Alexander Mitchell Integrated Arts Elementary School
 Rogers St. Academy
 William T. Sherman Multicultural Arts Elementary School
 Albert Story School
 Henry David Thoreau Elementary School
 Trowbridge St. Elementary School
 Victory K8 and Milwaukee Italian Immersion School
 Vieau School (Escuela Vieau)
 Westside Academy 
 Thurston Woods Campus Elementary School

Elementary schools (grades K-5) 

 Academy of Accelerated Learning
 Academia de Lenguaje y Bellas Artes  (ALBA) *
 Louisa May Alcott School
 Allen-Field School
 Lloyd Barbee Montessori School
 Clara Barton School 
 Brown St. Academy 
 Browning School
 William George Bruce School
 William Cullen Bryant School
 Clarke St. Elementary School 
 Samuel Clemens School
 Clement Ave. School
 Congress School
 Jeremiah Curtin Leadership Academy
 Anna F. Doerfler School
 Elm Creative Arts School
 Ralph Waldo Emerson School
 Engleburg School
 Fifty-Third St. School
 Forest Home Ave. School
 Benjamin Franklin School
 Fratney School (La Escuela Fratney)
 Lowell P. Goodrich School
 Hampton School
 Hawley Environmental School
 Nathaniel Hawthorne School
 Hayes Bilingual School
 Hi-Mount Blvd. School
 Highland Community School *
 Honey Creek Continuous Progress Charter School *
 Albert E. Kagel School
 Byron Kilbourn School
 Richard Kluge School
 Lincoln Ave. Community School
 Lancaster Elementary School
 Lowell International Elementary School
 Maple Tree School
 Marvin Pratt Elementary School
 Milwaukee French Immersion School
 Milwaukee German Immersion School 
 Milwaukee Spanish Immersion School
 Morgandale School
 Neeskara School
 Ninety-Fifth St. School
 Parkview Elementary School 
 James Whitcomb Riley Dual-Language Montessori School 
 River Trail Elementary School 
 Riverwest Elementary School
 Siefert Elementary School 
 Frances Brock Starms Discovery Learning Center 
 Frances Brock Starms Early Childhood Center 
 Gilbert Stuart Elementary School  
 Walt Whitman Elementary School 
 Whittier School *
 Clement J. Zablocki Elementary School

Middle schools (grades 6-8) 
 Audubon Technology & Communication Center Middle School
 Banner School of Milwaukee
 Lincoln Center of the Arts Middle School
 Roosevelt Middle School of the Arts
 Rufus King International School – Middle Years Campus
 Wedgewood Park International School

Middle and high schools (grades 6–12)  
 The Alliance School *
 Bay View Middle and High School
 Carmen Middle/High School of Science and Technology-Northwest Campus *
 Milwaukee School of Languages
 Samuel Morse John Marshall School for the Gifted and Talented

K–12 schools
 Hmong American Peace Academy *
 MacDowell Montessori School
 Barack Obama School of Career Technical and Education
 Wisconsin Conservatory of Lifelong Learning

High schools (grades 9-12)  

 Audubon Technology and Communication Center High School
 Barack Obama School of Career and Technical Education
 Lynde and Harry Bradley Technology and Trade School
 Carmen High School of Science and Technology (South Campus) *
 Alexander Hamilton High School
 Rufus King International School – High School Campus
 James Madison Academic Campus
 John Marshall High School
 Milwaukee Excel High School
 Milwaukee High School of the Arts
 Milwaukee School of Languages
 North Division High School
 Casimir Pulaski High School
 Riverside University High School
 Ronald Wilson Reagan College Preparatory High School
 South Division High School
 Harold S. Vincent High School
 Washington High School of Information Technology

See also
WI FACETS

References

Further reading
 (History PHD thesis)

External links
 

Education in Milwaukee
School districts in Wisconsin
1846 establishments in Wisconsin Territory
School districts established in 1846